Sukkiranpatti is a village in the Pattukkottai taluk of Thanjavur district, Tamil Nadu, India.
சுக்கிரன்பட்டி, இந்தியாவின், தமிழ்நாடு மாநிலம், தஞ்சாவூர் மாவட்டம், பட்டுக்கோட்டை வட்டத்தில் அமைந்துள்ள ஒரு கிராமம் ஆகும்.

Demographics 

As per the 2001 census, Sukkiranpatti had a total population of 1592 with 789 males and 803 females. The sex ratio was 1018. The literacy rate was 64.12.

References 

 

Villages in Thanjavur district